Locrian is an experimental music/drone rock band which formed in Chicago, Illinois, United States in late 2005 and is currently based in Chicago and Baltimore, Maryland. The band features Terence Hannum (synthesizers, vocals, tape loops), Steven Hess (drums, electronics), and André Foisy (electric, 12-string, acoustic guitars, tape loops, and electronics). The group incorporates influences from multiple genres including ambient, black metal, noise, drone, industrial, and electronics, and cite One Eyed God Prophecy, Uranus, Yes, Genesis, Brian Eno, and Robert Fripp as influences. 
Locrian lyrics and artwork evoke dystopic and apocalyptic imagery.  
Over their ten-year history, Locrian have released six studio albums, three collaborative albums, and numerous limited edition releases.

History
Locrian was formed in late 2005 by André Foisy and Terence Hannum, who had previously played together in Unlucky Atlas. Foisy is originally from Northern New York, while Hannum is from Florida. The group has released over 20 recordings in their relatively short lifespan, on labels such as Small Doses, Bloodlust!, and At War With False Noise, as well as on the group's private label Land of Decay.

In 2009, the band released their first studio album, Drenched Lands. The album was met with acclaim from the Chicago Tribune, the Chicago Reader, and Rock-A-Rolla magazine. Locrian followed its release with a U.S. tour, including a special Pitchfork Media sponsored 'Show No Mercy' show in New York City, NY. Their 2009 Rain of Ashes release features two 30-minute-long tracks recorded live at the University of Maryland's radio station WMUC. A second album, Territories, was released in 2010, which took the band in a more rock-oriented direction, featuring guest appearances from members of Nachtmystium, Bloodyminded, Yakuza, and Velnias, and this was followed by a third, The Crystal World, later the same year, the title coming from a J. G. Ballard novel.

In 2010, drummer Steven Hess joined the group as a permanent member. The group's first recording with Hess was The Crystal World. 
 
Locrian provided the soundtrack to Scott Treleaven's film piece The Last 7 Words featuring Genesis P-Orridge.

In addition to playing in the band, Terence Hannum is an installation artist who exhibited at the Museum of Contemporary Art, Chicago in 2007, and at the Peeler Art Center in 2010. Hannum and Foisy formerly taught at Columbia College Chicago. Currently, Hannum teaches at Stevenson University.

The band was signed to Relapse Records in 2012.

Musical style
The band's music was described by Allmusic as an "eclectic mixture of black metal, electronics, drone, and noise rock". Allmusic writer Ned Raggett also identified progressive rock influences on The Crystal World. The band have identified krautrock and 1990s death metal as influences.

Members 
André Foisy – guitar, bass, percussion
Terence Hannum – vocals, synthesizers, organs, tapes, guitar
Steven Hess – drums, percussion, electronics

Discography

Studio albums 
 Drenched Lands (2009) 
 Territories (2010)
 The Crystal World (2010)
 The Clearing (2011)
 Return to Annihilation (2013)
 Infinite Dissolution (2015)
 New Catastrophisms (2022)

EPs 
 Ghost Frontiers (2022)

Collaboration albums 
 New Dominions (collaboration with Horseback) (2011)
 Bless Them That Curse You (collaboration with Mamiffer) (2012)
 Locrian & Christoph Heemann (collaboration with Christoph Heemann) (2012)

Live albums 
Greyfield Shrines (2008)
Rhetoric of Surfaces (2008) 
Ruins of Morning (Plague Journal) (2008)
Rain of Ashes (2009)

References

External links 
 Locrian on Facebook
Locrian on Bandcamp

 Locrian discography on Discogs

American noise rock music groups
American black metal musical groups
Musical groups from Chicago
Musical groups established in 2005
American avant-garde metal musical groups
Relapse Records artists
Drone metal musical groups
Heavy metal musical groups from Illinois
American progressive metal musical groups
American musical trios
Utech Records artists